Nototropis swammerdamei is an amphipod crustacean of the family Atylidae.

Description

Its first two segments are smooth, and the third sometimes has a tooth on the back. Its first pair of legs is small, the second pair is larger, then the next legs are separated by a gap. The third and fourth pairs of legs are small, and the fifth, sixth, and seventh are long.

Distribution

It can be found along the shore and sublittoral zones near sand and algae throughout Europe, from the Arctic Circle by Norway to the Mediterranean Sea.

Taxonomic history

The species was first described as Amphithoe swammerdamei in 1830 by Henri Milne-Edwards. It was named after Jan Swammerdam, a Dutch biologist.

References

Crustaceans described in 1830
Gammaridea
Taxa named by Henri Milne-Edwards